Will Guzzardi is a Democratic member of the Illinois House of Representatives who represents the 39th District. The 39th District includes parts of the Avondale, Belmont Cragin, Hermosa, Old Irving Park, Portage Park and Logan Square. Guzzardi is a co-chair of the Illinois House's Progressive Caucus.

Early life, education, and career
Guzzardi was born in New York City. He grew up in Chapel Hill, North Carolina, before attending Brown University for college, where he graduated with a comparative literature degree.

He moved to Chicago in 2009 and worked as an associate editor for the Chicago branch of the Huffington Post. He later worked as the head writer for the University of Chicago Office of College Admissions.

Campaigns

In 2012, Guzzardi ran for the Illinois House of Representatives, but lost by 125 votes to the incumbent Maria Antonia Berrios, daughter of then Cook Country Democratic Party Chairman, Joseph Berrios. Berrios had the support of the Chicago Democratic establishment behind her, including endorsements from Cook County Board President Toni Preckwinkle as well as Illinois House Speaker Mike Madigan.

In 2014, Guzzardi again ran for the seat in one of the most-followed races in the city that year with the support of progressive groups like the Chicago Teachers Union and other progressive elected officials. Ultimately, Guzzardi defeated Berrios by a 20% margin.

Guzzardi's campaigns have focused on issues of social and economic inequality, and opposition to Chicago's machine politics.

Illinois General Assembly

As of July 3, 2022, Representative Guzzardi was a member of the following Illinois House committees:

 Criminal Administration and Enforcement Subcommittee (HJUC-CAES)
 Cybersecurity, Data Analytics, & IT Committee (HCDA)
 Firearms and Firearm Safety Subcommittee (HJUC-FIRE)
 (Chairman of) Housing Committee (SHOU)
 Judiciary - Criminal Committee (HJUC)
 Juvenile Justice and System-Involved Youth Subcommittee (HJUC-JJSI)
 (Chairman of) Prescription Drug Affordability (HPDA)
 Sentencing, Penalties and Criminal Procedure Subcommittee (HJUC-SPCP)
 Sex Offenses and Sex Offender Registration Subcommittee

Tenure 

As State Representative, Guzzardi has focused on issues pertaining to labor rights, progressive causes, and assistance for working families. 
Some of his enacted bills include:
 SB1 - Raises the minimum wage to $15 an hour in Illinois
 SB667 - A measure that caps the cost of insulin co-payments for insurance plans for 260,000 Illinoisans at $100 per month
 SB1351 - A student loan bill of rights to protect individuals with student loan debt from predatory lending practices
 HB303 - A law that reforms civic asset forfeitures practices by Illinois law enforcement to ensure Illinoisan's property is not taken unjustly
 SB2746 - A law that eliminates the “tampon tax” on feminine hygiene products. Previously, these products were subjected to being taxed as luxuries instead of medical essentials.

In 2018, J.B. Pritzker appointed Guzzardi a member of the gubernatorial transition's Job Creation and Economic Opportunity Committee.

Electoral history

References

External links
 www.willguzzardi.com - official campaign website
 www.repguzzardi.com - government office website

Living people
Brown University alumni
Democratic Party members of the Illinois House of Representatives
Politicians from Chicago
People from Chapel Hill, North Carolina
Year of birth missing (living people)
21st-century American politicians